Odium may refer to:

Gorky 17, released as Odium in North America, a computer game
Odium (album), by Morgoth, 1993

See also

Odeon (disambiguation)
Odiham, a village in Hampshire, England
Odium theologicum, the often intense anger and hatred generated by disputes over theology
Argumentum ad odium, where someone attempts to win favor for an argument by exploiting existing negative feelings in the opposing party